Nina Foxx is an American author, playwright and filmmaker. She has authored several novels, co-authored one text on writing, and her work has been anthologized multiple times. She has also penned two stage plays that include original music with collaborator John Forbes. Foxx writes under several names including: Nina Foxx and Cynnamon Foster. Foxx has lived in Austin, Texas.

Biography
Foxx is originally from Queens, New York.  She graduated from Hunter College (BA Psychology), Baruch College (MS, I/O, Psychology), City University of New York (Ph.D. I/O Psychology) and holds an MFA in Creative Writing (fiction) from Farleigh Dickinson University.

Prior to becoming a writer, Foxx worked for Dell. She authored several industrial design patents and has taught Applied Psychology at several universities. Foxx speaks about the writing life and blending the arts and technology to groups and schools all over the United States as part of various STEM efforts with groups such as The Links, Inc and code.org. In 2019, Foxx, along with her husband, founded The Writing Sisters Summit writer's retreat. Foxx is a member of Alpha Kappa Alpha sorority, The Links, Inc., The Girl Friends, Inc, and Jack and Jill of America.

Work
Foxx co-directed Marrying Up, which was based on her book of the same name. In addition to this film work, Foxx is Executive Producer of the feature film Magic Valley', which was an official selection of the 2011 TriBeCa Film Festival.

Foxx was nominated for an award in Outstanding Literary Work in Fiction by the NAACP Image Awards in 2014.

Books

As Cynnamon Foster
Eastern Spice (2011)
Southern Comfort (2010)
Northern Passion (2014)

As Nina Foxx
And You'd Better Not Tell
Momma: Gone A Personal Story
Catfish
A Letter for my Mother
Do Right Woman (2011). A serial novel
No Girl Needs a Husband Seven days A Week
Just Short of Crazy
Marrying Up
Going Buck Wild
Get Some Love
Dippin' My Spoon
Do The Write Thing: Seven Steps to Publishing Success (contributor)

Anthologies
Wanderlust: Erotic Travel Tales (edited by Carol Taylor)
Can't Help The Way That I Feel (edited by Lori Bryant Woolridge)

References

External links
www.ninafoxx.com
www.ninafoxx.blogspot.com
Nina at Harper Collins Publishers
Cynnamon at Stiletto Press

The Femme Fantastik Tour

21st-century American novelists
African-American novelists
American women novelists
People from Jamaica, Queens
Hillcrest High School alumni (Queens)
21st-century American dramatists and playwrights
American women dramatists and playwrights
21st-century American women writers
Living people
Hunter College alumni
Baruch College alumni
Native American dramatists and playwrights
Fairleigh Dickinson University alumni
Novelists from New York (state)
Year of birth missing (living people)
21st-century pseudonymous writers
Pseudonymous women writers
21st-century African-American women writers
21st-century African-American writers